Joseph John Martin (born 29 November 1988) is an English professional footballer who plays for National League South club Ebbsfleet United. He is a left-sided defender, who can also play as a midfielder. He represented England at under-16 and under-17 levels. He is the son of former West Ham United and England national team player Alvin Martin and the younger brother of professional footballer David Martin.

Club career

West Ham United and Tottenham Hotspur Academies
Born in Dagenham, east London, Martin was at West Ham United's Academy until 2005 when he moved to Tottenham Hotspur's Academy. He signed his first professional contract with Spurs on 1 July 2007.

Loan move to Blackpool
On transfer deadline day, 27 March 2008, he signed for Blackpool on loan until the end of the 2007–08 season; however, a calf injury meant he did not make an immediate debut and he was an unused substitute in the Seasiders away match at Plymouth Argyle on 26 April.

Blackpool manager Simon Grayson gave Martin his debut in the final match of the 2007–08 season, at home to Watford on 4 May 2008, a match which the Seasiders had to avoid defeat to avoid relegation to League One. Blackpool drew the match 1–1, with Martin playing on the left wing. Martin returned to Spurs at the end of the season; however, on 13 May 2008, he confirmed that he wanted to return to Blackpool for the 2008–09 season, saying, "That last game against Watford was brilliant and something I'll remember for the rest of my life." And adding "To make your debut in a match like that, when there was a sell-out crowd and so much riding on the outcome, was terrific. The manager seemed pretty pleased with how I did and hopefully I can come back here next year and help the club stay up, if not better. It's up to Tottenham whether I come back. They hold all the cards. But if there is a possibility of it happening then I would love to return to Blackpool. I am really glad that Blackpool stayed up because they are a brilliant club." Later that month Martin was linked, along with his brother, David, with a season-long loan move to Blackpool.

Blackpool
On 1 July 2008, it was confirmed that Tottenham Hotspur had accepted a bid for Martin from Blackpool and that the player was discussing personal terms. On 2 July, he signed a two-year contract with an option for a further year with Blackpool for an undisclosed fee. "[Spurs] offered me a new deal, but I wasn't really too keen on staying there. The first-team opportunities at White Hart Lane are limited and I want to get some experience and play regularly in the first team, so it was a bit of a no-brainer for me." Blackpool manager Simon Grayson added: "I think Joe looked at the situation and probably realised he wasn't going to be a first-team player there and the next best thing after that is Championship football. We are delighted to have got him and he's delighted to be here."

His first appearance for Blackpool since he signed permanently came on 12 August 2008 when he played in the Seasiders' 2–0 defeat to Macclesfield Town in the League Cup first round at Moss Rose. He then suffered a hip injury and his first league appearance came over one month later when he was a 70th-minute substitute in a 2–0 league defeat to Burnley at Turf Moor on 16 September. However, a leg injury again curtailed his season and his next appearance was not to come for another month when he was a second-half substitute in a 3–2 league win over Derby County at Bloomfield Road.

After playing in two League Cup games, Martin made his first league appearance of the 2009–10 season as a 46th-minute substitute in the 1–2 defeat to Reading at the Madjeski Stadium on 21 November 2009. His first start in the league came on 9 January 2010, in a 1–1 draw with Cardiff City at the Cardiff City Stadium.

Gillingham
On 30 June 2010 Martin was released by Blackpool manager Ian Holloway, he then spent several months on trial at Gillingham of League Two before being signed up. He made his Gillingham debut on 11 December 2010 in a 4–2 away win over Macclesfield Town. He played for the club for over five years, being an integral part of the side that won the 2012–13 Football League Two championship and earning a place in the PFA League Two Team of the Year, but was ultimately released at the end of the 2014–15 season after being deemed surplus to requirements.

Millwall
On 23 June 2015 Martin joined League One club Millwall on a one-year contract.

Stevenage
In June 2017, Martin joined Stevenage.

He was released by Stevenage at the end of the 2018–19 season.

Northampton Town
Martin joined Northampton Town in July 2019. He made his debut on the opening day of the season as Northampton suffered a 1–0 home defeat to Walsall. Martin came off of the bench in the 86' minute of a 3–0 victory at Cheltenham Town in the Play-Off semi-final second leg as Northampton overturned a 2–0 First Leg defeat to secure a place in the final at Wembley Stadium. Although Martin did not feature, Northampton beat Exeter City 4–0 to gain promotion.

Stevenage
On 29 January 2021, Martin returned to Stevenage. On 15 May 2021 it was announced that he would leave Stevenage at the end of the season, following the expiry of his contract.

Ebbsfleet United
In June 2021, Martin joined National League South side Ebbsfleet United.

International career
Martin played for England at under-16 and under-17 levels.

Career statistics

Honours
Gillingham

 EFL League Two: 2012–13

Northampton Town
EFL League Two play-offs: 2020

Individual
PFA Team of the Year: 2012–13 League Two

References

External links

England profile at theFA

1989 births
Living people
Footballers from Dagenham
English footballers
England youth international footballers
Association football defenders
Tottenham Hotspur F.C. players
Blackpool F.C. players
Gillingham F.C. players
Millwall F.C. players
Stevenage F.C. players
Bristol Rovers F.C. players
Northampton Town F.C. players
Ebbsfleet United F.C. players
English Football League players